The 2019–20 Liga Femenina de Baloncesto, also known as Liga Femenina Endesa for sponsorship reasons, was the 57th season of the Spanish basketball women's league. It started on 28 September 2019 with the first round of the regular season and was declared null and void on 8 May 2020 due to the COVID-19 pandemic.

Teams

Promotion and relegation (pre-season)
A total of 14 teams contested the league, including 12 sides from the 2018–19 season, and two promoted from the 2018–19 Liga Femenina 2.

Teams promoted from Liga Femenina 2
Campus Promete
Ciudad de La Laguna Tenerife

Venues and locations

Season summary
On March 10, 2020, the Government of Spain decreed that all games would be played behind closed doors due to the COVID-19 pandemic. On March 12, 2020, the Spanish Basketball Federation postponed all the games of the next two weeks. On March 18, 2020, the Spanish Basketball Federation extended the postponement of the games until March 29 due to the state of alarm. On March 25, 2020, the Spanish Basketball Federation extended the postponement of the games until April 12 due to the extension of state of alarm. On April 27, 2020, the Spanish Basketball Federation agreed with the Liga Femenina clubs to revoke relegations to Liga Femenina 2 and allow promotions from Liga Femenina 2 expanding the league for the next season to 16 teams with the discrepancies of some clubs.

On May 8, 2020, the Spanish Basketball Federation finished prematurely the regular season due to force majeure with the following decisions:
Relegations to Liga Femenina 2 were revoked.
Promotions from Liga Femenina 2 remained.
The league champion was declared null and void.
The final standings was fixed according to the standings as of March 1 for the allocation of places for European competitions.

Regular season

League table

Positions by round
The table lists the positions of teams after completion of each round. In order to preserve chronological evolvements, any postponed matches are not included in the round at which they were originally scheduled, but added to the full round they were played immediately afterwards. For example, if a match is scheduled for round 13, but then postponed and played between rounds 16 and 17, it will be added to the standings for round 16.

Results

Awards
All official awards of the 2019–20 Liga Femenina de Baloncesto.

MVP

Source:

National MVP

Source:

All–League Team

Source:

Best Young Player Award

Source:

Best Coach

Source:

Player of the round

Regular season

Spanish clubs in international competitions

Notes

References

External links
 Official website 

Fem
Liga Femenina de Baloncesto seasons
Spain
Liga Femenina